The 1988 Lamar Cardinals football season was the program's second season as an NCAA Division I-AA independent following the move from the Southland Conference to the newly formed non-football American South Conference. The Cardinals ended the season with a 3–8 overall record in the 1988 NCAA Division I-AA football season.  The Cardinals played their home games at the on-campus Cardinal Stadium, now named Provost Umphrey Stadium.

Schedule

References

Lamar
Lamar Cardinals football seasons
Lamar Cardinals football